Nyadol Nyuon,  (born 1987) is an Australian lawyer and human rights advocate, who was born in a refugee camp in Ethiopia, of a family fleeing the Second Sudanese Civil War. She works as a commercial litigator in Melbourne and is a regular media commentator.

Early life and education
Nyuon was born in the Itang refugee camp in Ethiopia in 1987, where she lived until the age of four. The family was forced to leave the camp due to conflict in Ethiopia, taking 40 days to walk back to an area then in southern Sudan (since 2011, part of South Sudan). Not long after arrival, Nyuon was separated from her mother. She rarely saw her father, Commander William Nyuon Bany, one of the founders of the Sudan People’s Liberation Army, as he was away fighting, and died in 1996.

She was raised by various step-mothers in Nairobi, Lodwar and at the Kakuma refugee camp in Kenya, where she did her primary and secondary schooling. It was also at Kakuma where she was inspired by the work of UNHCR lawyers and decided that she too wanted to be a lawyer. Her mother came and found her after her father's death and when she was about 14 years old, and brought her other siblings to Kakuma. Eight of them lived in a mud house.

In 2005 the family was accepted as migrants to Australia, and Nyuon was 18 years old when they arrived in Melbourne, penniless.  After attaining her Victorian Certificate of Education, she earned a Bachelor of Arts at Victoria University before being accepted into Melbourne Law School at the University of Melbourne, where she achieved Juris Doctor. She was helped to achieve a scholarship by one of her professors, and was later given $10,000 by a woman she met by chance at a dinner, who was touched by her story. Her younger brother Bigoa became an Australian rules football player.

Career
Nyuon has previously worked for prominent law firm Arnold Bloch Leibler.

Nyuon was drawn into fighting for the rights of African Australians after a number of racist incidents targeting her, her friends and others. She was trolled mercilessly after speaking out about Home Affairs Minister Peter Dutton's allegation in 2018 that Victorians were “scared to go out in restaurants” because of “African gang violence”. She is determined to create a fairer Australia, pointing out the serious effects of racism on the victim's health.

Nyuon is also a writer, a regular media commentator on programs such as ABC’s The Drum and Q + A , a volunteer and a keynote speaker.

Nyuon has written for The Age, The Sydney Morning Herald, The Saturday Paper, The Guardian the Australasian Review of African Studies, Australian Mosaic (quarterly magazine published by the Federation of Ethnic Communities' Councils of Australia) and Offset (Victoria University’s annual literary magazine).

After an appearance on Q+A on 15 June 2020, Nyuon was sent abusive messages on Facebook which were later found to have come from a serving police officer in South Australia Police. After this had come to light, the officer was put onto administrative duties and became the subject of an internal investigation. She said that she was regularly sent abusive messages after appearing on television, and would be taking some time off.

In September 2020 Nyuon was appointed chair of Harmony Alliance: Migrant and Refugee Women for Change, a national coalition of migrant and refugee women in Australia.

On 30 June 2021 Nyuon made a speech to the National Press Club in Canberra, titled 'Australia Reimagined', in her role as chair of Harmony Alliance: Migrant and Refugee Women for Change.

In 2021, Nuyon was a nominee for the 2022 Victoria Australian of the Year Awards. 

On 20 November 2021, Victoria University in Melbourne announced that Nyoun had been appointed as the Director of the Sir Zelman Cowen Centre. She will take up the position as Director on 31 January 2022. The Centre provides legal education, training and research with a focus on law and cultural diversity.

Recognition and awards
2011 and 2014 – nominated as one of the hundred most influential African Australians
2016 –  Future Justice Prize, an award "for an entrepreneurial person or organisation that has initiated and driven projects to advance future justice"
2018 – Australian Human Rights Commission’s "Racism. It Stops With Me" Award, for her efforts to combat racism in Australia
2018 – Harmony Alliance Award for her contribution to empowering migrant and refugee women
2018 – co-winner of the Tim McCoy Prize for her advocacy on behalf of the South Sudanese community in Australia
2019 – recognised as one of two Australian Financial Review Women of Influence, along with environmentalist Anna Rose
? –  Afro-Australian Student Organisation‘s "Unsung Hero Award"
2022 – Medal of the Order of Australia (OAM), Queen's Birthday Honours, for "service to human rights and refugee women"

Selected works
 (An essay written during the COVID-19 pandemic in Australia, included in the anthology Fire, Flood and Plague, edited by Sophie Cunningham)

References

External links

1987 births
21st-century Australian lawyers
21st-century women lawyers
Australian human rights activists
Australian women lawyers
South Sudanese refugees
Living people
Melbourne Law School alumni
Recipients of the Medal of the Order of Australia
South Sudanese emigrants to Australia
Women human rights activists
Lawyers from Melbourne
Refugees in Ethiopia
Refugees in Kenya